The New Brunswick Senior Baseball League is the highest level of amateur baseball play in New Brunswick, Canada.

Current teams

List of league champions

See also
Baseball awards#Canada
New Brunswick Senior Baseball League 
Moncton Fisher Cats
Chatham Ironmen
Fredericton Royals
Saint John Alpines
Charlottetown Islanders

Baseball leagues in Canada
Summer baseball leagues